EgyptAir Flight 763 was an international non-scheduled passenger flight from Cairo, Egypt, to Aden, South Yemen. On 19 March 1972, the flight was a McDonnell Douglas DC-9-32 registered in Yugoslavia as YU-AHR and operated by the newly renamed EgyptAir. It crashed into the Shamsan Mountains on approach to Aden, killing all 30 people on board.

Aircraft
The aircraft involved was a McDonnell Douglas DC-9-32. It was built in 1970 as construction number 47503 with manufacturer's serial number 587 and registered as YU-AHR.

Accident
On 19 March 1972 EgyptAir Flight 763 was on a flight from Cairo International Airport in Egypt to Aden International Airport in the People's Democratic Republic of Yemen (South Yemen), via Jeddah, Saudi Arabia. The aircraft was chartered from the Yugoslav airline Inex Adria with 21 passengers and 9 crew members on board. On impact the aircraft burned, killing all on board. At the time of the accident, it was the deadliest to have occurred in South Yemen. As of November 2011, it remains the deadliest civil aviation accident and the second deadliest aviation accident to have occurred in Yemen.

References

External links
 McDonnell Douglas DC-9 AC Gleaner
  Airdisaster.com (erroneously shows Shamsam, Vietnam vice Jebel Shamsan near Aden, South Yemen) 
Photo of YU-AHR

763
Aviation accidents and incidents in Yemen
Accidents and incidents involving the McDonnell Douglas DC-9
Aviation accidents and incidents in 1972
1972 in Egypt
1972 in South Yemen
20th century in Aden
March 1972 events in Asia
1972 disasters in Asia